Iain Morrison (born 6 May 1983), also known by the nickname of "Drago", is a former Scotland international rugby league footballer who last played for Featherstone Rovers after signing in October 2009. He signed for Hull Kingston Rovers from Huddersfield after he had initially come through London Broncos academy.

Background
Morrison was born in Edgware, London, England.

Playing career
Although he was born in London, Morrison has represented Scotland on several occasions due to his heritage.

He was released from Hull Kingston Rovers on 17 September 2007, and on 21 September 2007 signed for Widnes.

He was named in the Scotland training squad for the 2008 Rugby League World Cup.

He was named in the Scotland squad for the 2008 Rugby League World Cup.
After the World Cup Morrison was named Scottish player of the year for 2008. He was named Scottish player of the year for 2009.

References

External links
(archived by web.archive.org) Widnes Vikings profile

1983 births
Living people
English people of Scottish descent
English rugby league players
Featherstone Rovers players
Gloucester Rugby players
Halifax R.L.F.C. players
Harlequin F.C. players
Huddersfield Giants players
Hull Kingston Rovers players
London Broncos players
Oxford Rugby League players
People from Edgware
Rugby league players from London
Rugby league second-rows
Rugby league props
Scotland national rugby league team players
Whitehaven R.L.F.C. players
Widnes Vikings players
York City Knights players